Bantanges is a commune in the Saône-et-Loire department in the region of Bourgogne-Franche-Comté in eastern France.

Geography
The commune lies on the plain of Bresse in the east of the department.

The Seille forms the commune's northwestern border. The Sâne Morte forms most of the commune's southeastern border.

Population

See also
Communes of the Saône-et-Loire department

References

Communes of Saône-et-Loire